Leucopogon acicularis is a species of flowering plant in the family Ericaceae and is endemic to the south-west of Western Australia.

It was first formally described in 1868 by George Bentham in Flora Australiensis from specimens collected by George Maxwell. The specific epithet (acicularis) means "needle-pointed", referring to the leaves.

References 

acicularis
Ericales of Australia
Flora of Western Australia
Plants described in 1868
Taxa named by George Bentham